Articulavirales is an order of segmented negative-strand RNA viruses which infect invertebrates and vertebrates. It includes the family of influenza viruses which infect humans. It is the only order of viruses in the monotypic class Insthoviricetes. The order contains two families and eight genera.

Etymology 
The order name Articulavirales derives from Latin  meaning "segmented" (alluding to the segmented genome of member viruses) added to the suffix for virus orders -virales. The class name Insthoviricetes is a portmanteau of member viruses "influenza, isavirus, and thogotovirus" added to the suffix -viricetes for virus classes.

Genome 
Member viruses have segmented, negative-sense, single-stranded RNA genomes.

Classification 

The order Articulavirales contains two families and eight genera:
 Amnoonviridae
 Tilapinevirus
 Orthomyxoviridae
 Alphainfluenzavirus
 Betainfluenzavirus
 Deltainfluenzavirus
 Gammainfluenzavirus
 Isavirus
 Quaranjavirus
 Thogotovirus

References

Virus orders
Negarnaviricota